Jiří Kladrubský (born 19 November 1985) is a former Czech footballer who played for České Budějovice.

Career
His primary position was as a defensive midfielder, although he can also play in any position along the back line, and has appeared regularly at left back, despite being naturally right footed.

On 17 November 2007 he was called up to the Czech Republic national football team for a Euro 2008 qualifier against Slovakia and made his debut on 21 November 2007 against Albania in a 6-1 victory.

References

External links
 Slovan Bratislava profile
 
 ISM profile
 Sparta profile
 

1985 births
Living people
Sportspeople from České Budějovice
Association football midfielders
Czech footballers
Czech Republic under-21 international footballers
Czech Republic international footballers
SK Dynamo České Budějovice players
AC Sparta Prague players
ŠK Slovan Bratislava players
Czech First League players
Slovak Super Liga players
Czech expatriate footballers
Expatriate footballers in Slovakia
Czech expatriate sportspeople in Slovakia
AEL Kalloni F.C. players
F.C. Pavia players
Expatriate footballers in Greece
Expatriate footballers in Italy
Czech expatriate sportspeople in Greece
Czech expatriate sportspeople in Italy
Super League Greece players